The Mingan Formation is a geologic formation in Quebec. It preserves fossils dating back to the Ordovician period.

See also 
 List of fossiliferous stratigraphic units in Quebec

References 

Ordovician System of North America
Ordovician Quebec
Ordovician southern paleotemperate deposits